In enzymology, an adenosine-tetraphosphatase is an enzyme that catalyzes the chemical reaction

adenosine 5'-tetraphosphate + H2O  ATP + phosphate

Thus, the two substrates of this enzyme are adenosine 5'-tetraphosphate and H2O, whereas its two products are ATP and phosphate.

This enzyme belongs to the family of hydrolases, specifically those acting on acid anhydrides in phosphorus-containing anhydrides.  The systematic name of this enzyme class is adenosine-tetraphosphate phosphohydrolase. This enzyme participates in purine metabolism.

Structural studies

As of late 2007, only one structure has been solved for this class of enzymes, with the PDB accession code .

References

 

EC 3.6.1
Enzymes of known structure